Philipe Charles Félix Macquart, Baron de Rullecourt was a French soldier who became a general of the Kingdom of France. In 1781, he was mortally wounded commanding the attempted invasion of Jersey at the Battle of Jersey.

Biography 
Philipe Charles Félix Macquart was born in Artois in a wealthy family originating in Orléans. His title "Baron de Rullecourt" was self-bestowed, and was a soldier for hire. He was placed in command of French troops during the 1779 failed invasion of Jersey, as second-in-command to the Prince of Nassau-Siegen. 

Two years later, he launched another invasion attempt on Jersey. His second-in-command Mir Sayyad advised him to ransack the island and to kill all civilians, but instead the commander captured the governor Moses Corbet, and used him as a tool to try and engineer a British surrender. But the British soldiers on the island refused to surrender, and Philippe was mortally wounded in the following battle in which the British outnumbered the French. Rullecourt died a day later of his wounds, in the modern-day Peirson Pub. He had failed in his attempt to bluff the British into surrender.

References 
http://www.guernsey-society.org.uk/donkipedia/index.php5?title=Baron_de_Rullecourt

1744 births
1781 deaths
French military personnel killed in the American Revolutionary War
French generals